, known as Screaming Mad George (born October 7, 1956), is a Japanese special effects artist, film director, and former musician.  He was born in Osaka, Japan, and emigrated to the United States, where he has become known for his surreal, gory special effects.  He has collaborated with director and producer Brian Yuzna on many films.

Biography 
Born Joji Tani in Osaka, Japan, he took the first name George in order to stand out.  Upon emigrating to the United States, where he graduated from the School of Visual Arts, he changed his name to Screaming Mad George in order to distinguish himself among the other Georges in an Anglophone country.  The moniker was influenced by his love for Mad Magazine and Screamin' Jay Hawkins.

Career 
George began as a punk rock musician and played with the late 1970s band The Mad.  His gory music videos led to a job in the film industry, where he worked on special make-up effects.  His early work includes effects on Big Trouble in Little China (1986), Predator (1987), A Nightmare on Elm Street 3: Dream Warriors (1987),  the cockroach scene in A Nightmare on Elm Street 4: The Dream Master (1988), and Arena (1989).  In 1989 he returned to his home country of Japan to direct the special effects for Tokyo: The Last War, a big budget follow up to the dark fantasy blockbuster Tokyo: The Last Megalopolis.  In 1989 he also began a long-term collaboration with director Brian Yuzna with Society.  In a negative review, Variety called the film's SFX-laden climax "sickening", and the Austin Chronicle called the effects "cheesy".  In more positive reviews, the Los Angeles Times called George the real star of the film, and Empire wrote, "Yuzna and his veteran special effects man Screaming Mad George serve up this literal slime with such verve, wit and overall verbal and visual flair that the movie also stands as one of the very finest of teen comedies."

In a 1990 follow-up with Yuzna, George provided special effects for Silent Night, Deadly Night 4: Initiation (1990) that Variety called "imaginative" and "just what modern horror fans crave". In 1991, he made his directorial debut with The Guyver, which he co-directed with Steve Wang.  Yuzna produced the film.  In America, the film was recut by New Line to remove some of the humor and focus more on action.  Entertainment Weekly rated the film "C" and said that while the effects were good, the film was too clichéd.  The Los Angeles Times called his creature effects in Freaked (1993) "terrific", and Ain't It Cool News said that George's work was the best reason to watch the film. In 1993, he returned to music releasing the album Transmutation  under Extasy Records with a group called Screaming Mad George & Psychosis.

Witney Seibold of CraveOnline wrote of Children of the Corn III: Urban Harvest (1995), "Any character that this film has is due to [George]."  Stuart Gordon chose George to perform special effects in Space Truckers (1996) based on his previous work and his ability to speak Japanese, as creature designer Hajime Sorayama wanted to be involved in the film's production.  Variety was warm toward his effects in Tales from the Hood (1995) and Progeny (1998).  He teamed up again with Yuzna in Faust: Love of the Damned (2000) and Beyond Re-Animator (2003).

Awards

Filmography

Makeup and special effects 
 Big Trouble in Little China (1986)
 Predator (1987)
 A Nightmare on Elm Street 3: Dream Warriors (1987)
 Don't Panic (1987)
 A Nightmare on Elm Street 4: The Dream Master (1988)
 Hide and Go Shriek (1988)
 Arena (1989)
 Curse II: The Bite (1989)
 Society (1989)
 Bride of Re-Animator (1989)
 Tokyo: The Last War (1989)
 Silent Night, Deadly Night 4: Initiation (1990)
 Silent Night, Deadly Night 5: The Toy Maker (1991)
 Freaked (1993)
 Children of the Corn III: Urban Harvest (1995)
 Tales from the Hood (1995)
 Space Truckers (1996)
 Progeny (1998)
 Faust: Love of the Damned (2000)
 Beyond Re-Animator (2003)

Director 
 The Guyver (1991)

Video game work 
 Screaming Mad George's ParanoiaScape (1998)

Discography

Musician
 Eyeball (1978, The Mad)
 Fried Egg (1980, The Mad)
 Transmutation (1993, Screaming Mad George & Psychosis)

Effects
X Japan – Jealousy front cover concept, mask, make up (1991)
Seikima-II – Kyoufu No Restaurant / FRIGHTFUL RESTAURANT front cover concept (1992)
hide – Hide Your Face mask (1994)
Slipknot – masks (Iowa and Vol. 3: (The Subliminal Verses))
Marilyn Manson (makeup)

References

Sources

External links 
 

Living people
1956 births
People from Osaka
Japanese film directors
Japanese make-up artists
Special effects people
Japanese male rock singers
Japanese punk rock musicians
Japanese songwriters